Stephen White (born 14 October 1988) is an Irish hurler who played as a midfielder for the Cork senior team.

Born in Ballygarvan, County Cork, White first played competitive hurling in his younger days. He arrived on the inter-county scene at the age of sixteen when he first linked up with the Cork minor team, before later lining out with the under-21 and intermediate sides. He made his senior debut in the 2008 National Hurling League. White has since gone on to be a regular member of the team, however, he has yet to claim any silverware.

At club level White is a Munster medallist in the junior grade with Ballygarvan. He has also won a junior championship medal with the club.

Playing career

Club

White plays his club hurling and Gaelic football with Ballygarvan and has enjoyed much success.

In 2004 White was only fifteen years-old when he started playing with the club's top team. A 3-7 to 1-12 defeat of Grenagh gave him a junior championship medal. Ballygravan later claimed the provincial crown, with White collecting a Munster medal following a 0-16 to 1-5 defeat of Tramore.

Inter-county

White joined the Cork minor hurling team in 2005 and made his championship debut when he came on as a substitute in a 4-28 to 0-1 trouncing of Kerry in the Munster quarter-final. He later collected his first Munster medal following a 2-18 to 1-12 defeat of Limerick.

White was eligible for the minor grade again in 2006. A 2-20 to 1-15 defeat of Tipperary gave him a second Munster medal on the field of play.

In 2007 White made his Cork under-21 debut. On 1 August 2007 he won a Munster medal in this grade following a 1-20 to 0-10 trouncing of Waterford.

White made his senior debut with Cork during the 2008 National Hurling League, while he also linked up with the Cork intermediate hurling team.

After a number of years off the team, White returned to the Cork senior team in 2013. On 14 July 2013 White made his senior championship debut when he came on as a substitute in the Munster decider. Cork faced a 0-24 to 0-15 defeat by Limerick on that occasion. On 8 September 2013 White came on as a substitute in the All-Ireland decider against Clare. Three second-half goals through Conor Lehane, Anthony Nash and Pa Cronin, and a tenth point of the game from Patrick Horgan gave Cork a one-point lead as injury time came to an end. A last-gasp point from corner-back Domhnall O'Donovan earned Clare a 0-25 to 3-16 draw and a replay on 28 September.

On 3 April 2014 it was announced that White had been unfairly dropped from Cork's championship panel.

Honours

Team

Ballygarvan
Munster Junior Club Hurling Championship (1): 2004
Cork Junior Hurling Championship (1): 2004

Cork
Munster Under-21 Hurling Championship (1): 2008
Munster Minor Hurling Championship (2): 2005, 2006

References

1988 births
Living people
Ballygarvan hurlers
Ballygarvan Gaelic footballers
CIT hurlers
Cork inter-county hurlers